Take Three Girls is a television drama series broadcast by BBC1 between 1969 and 1971 that follows three young women sharing a flat in "Swinging London" (located at 17 Glazbury Road, West Kensington, W14). It was BBC1's first colour drama series.

The first series featured cellist Victoria (Liza Goddard), single mother Kate (Susan Jameson), and Cockney art student Avril (Angela Down). For the second series, Kate and Avril were replaced by journalist Jenny (Carolyn Seymour) and American psychology graduate Lulie (Barra Grant).

Two series, each of 12 episodes, were shown on BBC1 between 1969 and 1971, with selected repeats between the series. Only 10 episodes of the original 24 still exist.

A four-episode sequel, Take Three Women, broadcast on BBC2 in 1982, shows the original three characters later in their lives. Victoria is a widow with a young daughter, and Avril an art gallery owner, while Kate is sharing her life with her son and his teacher.

The theme music – "Light Flight" by the British folk rock group Pentangle – was a British chart hit in February 1970. Pentangle also contributed music to Take Three Women.

A tie-in novel, Victoria, by scriptwriters Terence Brady and Charlotte Bingham, was published in 1972 by W. H. Allen Ltd.

Episodes
All episodes were made on colour videotape, with the exception of Season 1, episode 10, which was shot entirely on 35mm film.

Take Three Girls - Season 1

Take Three Girls - Season 2

Take Three Women

References

1960s British drama television series
1970s British drama television series
Television shows set in London
BBC television dramas
Women in London